Speed skating at the 1976 Winter Olympics, was held from 5 to 14 February. Nine events were contested at Eisschnelllaufbahn Innsbruck. This was the first Olympics which included the men's 1000 metres, and the first change to the men's program at the Olympics since the elimination of the all-round event in 1928.

Medal summary

Medal table

The Soviet Union led the medal table, with four gold and nine overall. The silver medal for East Germany's Andrea Ehrig-Mitscherlich was the country's first in speed skating.

Tatyana Averina led the individual medal table, winning a medal in all four women's events, two gold and two bronze. Sheila Young won three medals one of each value on the three shortest distances for women,. The most successful male skaters were  Norway's Sten Stensen and the Netherlands' Piet Kleine, who both won one gold and one silver medal, splitting the long distance events. The dutch speed skater Hans van Helden won the bronze-medals on all the three longest distances for men. The Soviet Union speed skater Valery Muratov also got a multiple set of medals with a silver medal in the 500 metres event and the bronze medal in the 1000 metres event.

Men's events

Women's events

Records

Eight out of the nine events, including the debuting men's 1000 metres, had new Olympic records set, with only the men's 5000 metres record remaining unbroken.

Participating NOCs

Nineteen nations competed in the speed skating events at Innsbruck.

References

 
1976 Winter Olympics events
1976
1976 in speed skating
Olympics, 1976